Shag Thomas (born James Thomas, August 11, 1924 – July 25, 1982) was an American professional wrestler during the 1950s and 1960s. He was one of the few African-American wrestlers of his day.

Football career
Thomas was a 1942 graduate of Bellaire High School in Bellaire, Ohio playing football for the Big Reds under head coach John "Butch" Niemiec, a former star player at the University of Notre Dame under Knute Rockne. In his four years in high school the Big Reds went 31-6-1 and an Ohio Valley Athletic Association title. Thomas was a World War II veteran and member of the 1950 Rose Bowl champion Ohio State Buckeye squad that entered that game at 6-1-2 (number 6 in the AP poll).  In July 1950, he signed a contract with the Green Bay Packers and appeared in pre-season games that year, but was cut prior to the final exhibition game.

Career
Born in Stewartsville, Ohio, Thomas began wrestling during a time when segregation in professional wrestling was still taking place in some territories and promotions throughout the United States.  He gained prominence while wrestling in the NWA Pacific Northwest Territory for promoter Don Owen.  Owen did not segregate his wrestlers, and Thomas flourished there, winning the Pacific Northwest Heavyweight Championship twice and the Tag Team Championship 16 times.

Thomas retired from wrestling in 1969 after defeating Roger Kirby by disqualification in his final match.  After retirement, he refereed wrestling matches on  Owens' Portland Wrestling broadcast Saturday nights on KPTV. In 1972, Thomas came out of retirement and returned to wrestling until 1976.

Personal
Thomas' younger brother, Clyde Thomas, starred in the backfield for Ohio University on its undefeated team in 1960. Clyde played football for the NFL Philadelphia Eagles, CFL British Columbia Lions, and UFL Wheeling Ironmen.

Thomas died of a heart attack on July 25, 1982 at the age of 57.

Championships and accomplishments
Bellaire High School
Wall of Fame Induction Class of 1993
NWA Los Angeles
NWA "Beat the Champ" Television Championship (1 time)
Pacific Northwest Wrestling
NWA Pacific Northwest Heavyweight Championship (2 times)
NWA Pacific Northwest Tag Team Championship (16 times) - with Luther Lindsey (4), Pepper Martin (3), Tony Borne (2), Bearcat Wright (2), Billy White Wolf (1), Danny Hodge (1), Don Manoukian (1), Armand Hussein (1), and Rene Goulet (1)
Stampede Wrestling
NWA Canadian Tag Team Championship (Calgary version) (1 time) - with Mighty Ursus
NWA International Tag Team Championship (Calgary version) (1 time) - with Mighty Ursus

References

External links
 Black History Month: Pro Wrestling's Black Stars, Part 1
 Online World of Wrestling

American male professional wrestlers
Sportspeople from Portland, Oregon
1924 births
1982 deaths
Sportspeople from Columbus, Ohio
African-American male professional wrestlers
Professional wrestlers from Ohio
Professional wrestlers from Oregon
20th-century American male actors
Stampede Wrestling alumni
American military personnel of World War II
20th-century African-American sportspeople
NWA "Beat the Champ" Television Champions
NWA Canadian Tag Team Champions (Calgary version)
Stampede Wrestling International Tag Team Champions